Ecclesia Pistis Sophia, or the Sophian Fellowship, is a Gnostic church organization based in the United States.

Etymology
The name Ecclesia Pistis Sophia literally means "Community of Faith-Wisdom."

History
Although members claim that it dates back to at least the 1700s, the current Sophian Gnostic spiritual lineage was first started in the 1880s by Tau Miriam, an Englishwoman. In England, she initiated Tau Elijah, who, early in the twentieth century, moved to the West Coast of the United States.

Tau Elijah died and passed his spiritual lineage on to Tau Malachi eben Ha-Elijah, who later founded the Sophia Fellowship in 1983. Tau Malachi is the current bishop of Ecclesia Pistis Sophia. The church is operating in Grass Valley, California.

Leadership
Tau Miriam (mid-1880s to early 1900s)
Tau Elijah (late 1800s to 1970s)
Tau Malachi (Brett Cagle) (1962 to present)

See also
Gnosticism
Gnosticism in modern times
Ecclesia Gnostica Catholica
Gnostic Society
Gnostic Church of France

References

External links

Ecclesia Pistis Sophia
YouTube
Facebook
Twitter

Gnosticism
Christian mysticism
Christian movements
Esoteric Christianity
Wichita Falls, Texas
Grass Valley, California